Olivia Paige "Livvy" Dunne (born October 1, 2002) is an American artistic gymnast and social media personality. A former USA national team member and a current member of the LSU Tigers women's gymnastics team, she is the highest-valued women's college athlete as of 2022. Dunne's social media following of over 10 million has resulted in endorsement deals for her name, image, and likeness totaling seven figures.

Early life
Dunne was born in Westwood, New Jersey in 2002 and raised in Hillsdale, New Jersey. She started her gymnastics training in 2005 at ENA Gymnastics in Paramus, New Jersey. By the time she was 14 years old, Dunne was homeschooled by her mother while she spent her days training with her coach Craig Zappa at ENA Gymnastics. Though she did not attend her public high school, she managed the high school gymnastics team at Pascack Valley High School with her older sister.

Gymnastics career

Junior

2014–15 
Dunne made her elite debut at the 2014 American Classic where she finished 28th in the all-around.  She next competed at the U.S. Classic where she placed 33rd in the all-around.

In 2015 Dunne re-qualified for elite status at the WOGA Classic, where she earned a qualifying score of 52.750 and placed fifth.  She next competed at the American Classic where she placed eighth and qualified to compete at the 2015 National Championships.  Dunne competed at the U.S. Classic where she placed 24th in the all-around.  Dunne made her National Championships debut in 2015 where she placed 25th in the all-around.

2016 
Dunne competed at the 2016 American Classic where she finished 27th in the all-around.  She next competed at the 2016 U.S. Classic where she finished 24th.  Dunne concluded the season competing at the 2016 National Championships where she finished 12th in the all-around.  She also placed eighth on balance beam and sixth on floor exercise.

2017 

In March, Dunne was selected for the team to compete at the 2017 City of Jesolo Trophy; as a result she was added to the National Team for the first time.  She made her international debut there and placed sixth in the all-around.  Dunne competed at the 2017 U.S. Classic in July where she finished fifth in the all-around.  At the 2017 National Championships Dunne finished ninth in the all-around.

Senior

2018–20
Dunne turned senior in 2018.  Although the United States did not send a team, Dunne represented her club at the 2018 City of Jesolo Trophy.  She finished 15th in the all-around.  She competed at the 2018 U.S. Classic only on uneven bars due to an ankle injury. Dunne qualified to compete at the National Championships via petition.  She ended up placing 18th in the all-around.

Dunne did not compete during the 2019 season in order to rest her injuries.  In November Dunne officially signed her National Letter of Intent with Louisiana State University, starting in the 2020–21 season.

Dunne qualified to the 2020 Nastia Liukin Cup after dropping down to Level 10.  She ended up placing 11th.

NCAA
Dunne joined the LSU Tigers gymnastics team in 2020.

2020–21 season
Dunne competed on the uneven bars in every regular-season meet. She made her NCAA debut in a meet against Arkansas, scoring 9.875. She entered the postseason with an NQS of 9.9 on bars.

At the SEC Championships she contributed an uneven bars score of 9.9 to LSU's second-place team finish.  At the NCAA Championships semi-finals she again scored 9.9 on bars; LSU did not advance to the finals.

2021–22 season 
Dunne again competed on the uneven bars in every regular-season meet and also competed five times on the floor exercise. She matched her career-high of 9.925 on the uneven bars during the opening meet against Centenary. She earned a score of 9.800 in her collegiate debut on floor on January 28.

At the SEC Championships she contributed an uneven bars score of 9.875, but LSU was forced to count a fall on that event and finished in fifth place overall.

At the NCAA regional semifinals she contributed scores of 9.85 on uneven bars and 9.9 on floor exercise. LSU suffered two uncharacteristic falls on balance beam and as a result was eliminated from the postseason during the first round of regionals, failing to qualify to the national championship as a team for the first time since 2011.

2022-2023 season 
After missing much of the season due to various injuries including two torn labrums, a torn bicep, and a stress reaction in her leg, Dunne made her season debut on February 24 against Alabama, scoring a 9.825 on the uneven bars.

Social media fame 
Dunne joined the social media platform TikTok in 2020. Initially she posted videos of her gymnastics but later started posting videos of other areas of her life as well. As of February 2023, Dunne is the most-followed NCAA athlete on social media with more than 7 million followers on TikTok and 3 million on Instagram.

On July 2, 2021, the NCAA changed its rule to allow its athletes to earn money from their name, image, and likeness.  Dunne was projected to earn more compensation than any other collegiate athlete due to her large social media platform, which was a combined five million followers across both Instagram and TikTok at the time the rule change took effect.  In August, Dunne announced that she signed with WME Sports, becoming their first NIL athlete.  A month later, she announced her first exclusive brand partnership with activewear brand Vuori.

Dunne is currently the highest-valued women's college athlete with an estimated NIL valuation of $3.3 million. In February 2023, she reported to Today that her endorsement deals total seven figures.

On January 6, 2023, a large group of fans showed up to LSU's opening meet of the season at Utah to support Dunne. Some of these fans were reportedly harassing members of both gymnastics teams as well as journalists both during and after the meet. As a result of this, LSU hired additional security staff for the team and implemented increased safety measures including disallowing LSU gymnasts to go into the stands after a meet. Following the incident, Dunne posted a statement to Twitter requesting that her fans be more respectful.

On February 27, 2023, Dunne posted a paid-sponsorship video to TikTok promoting Caktus AI with the caption "Needing to get my creativity flowing for my essay due at midnight". The video showed her generating an essay using the service, with the camera then panning to show a shocked expression on the star, concluding with the caption "Cactus.AI > ChatGPT". LSU issued a statement that “At LSU, our professors and students are empowered to use technology for learning and pursuing the highest standards of academic integrity. However, using AI to produce work that a student then represents as one’s own could result in a charge of academic misconduct, as outlined in the Code of Student Conduct."

Competitive history

References

External links 

 
 

2002 births
American female artistic gymnasts
Living people
LSU Tigers women's gymnasts
People from Hillsdale, New Jersey
Sportspeople from Bergen County, New Jersey
U.S. women's national team gymnasts
American TikTokers
Social media influencers